These are the Australian Country number-one albums of 2023, per the ARIA Charts.

Chart history

See also
2023 in music
List of number-one albums of 2023 (Australia)

References

2023
Australia country albums
Number-one country albums